Yayuk Basuki and Caroline Vis were the defending champions, but Basuki did not compete this year. Vis teamed up with Alexandra Fusai and lost in quarterfinals to tournament winners Barbara Rittner and María Vento-Kabchi.

Barbara Rittner and María Vento-Kabchi won the title by defeating Sandrine Testud and Roberta Vinci 6–3, 6–2 in the final.

Seeds

Draw

Draw

Qualifying

Qualifying seeds

Qualifiers
  Hsieh Su-wei /  Angelique Widjaja

Qualifying draw

References

External links
 Official results archive (ITF)
 Official results archive (WTA)

Dubai Duty Free Women's Open - Doubles
Doubles